Andrew John Durnion (18 February 1907 – 1985) was a Scottish professional football forward who played in the Football League for Gillingham, Brentford and Thames.

Career statistics

References

Scottish footballers
English Football League players
Brentford F.C. players
Footballers from Hamilton, South Lanarkshire
Association football forwards
Gillingham F.C. players
Thames A.F.C. players
1907 births
1985 deaths